Szeroki Bór Piski is a settlement in the administrative district of Gmina Pisz, within Pisz County, Warmian-Masurian Voivodeship, in northern Poland.

Throughout World War II, the Oberkommando der Luftwaffe (Air Force High Command) was temporarily located in Breitenheide.

References

Villages in Pisz County